Legging may refer to:

 Legging, a low tackle in Australian rules football
 Leggings, a type of clothing
 Legging (canals), a means of propelling boats through canal tunnels
 Blacklegging, in labor striking
 Dead-legging, performing a peroneal strike on someone
 Ferret-legging, a sport where a ferret is trapped in a pant leg while worn

See also
 Bootlegging (disambiguation)
 Leg (disambiguation)